Lakeside High School is a public high school located in Evans, Georgia, United States, in Columbia County.

History
Construction was completed in 1988, and the first classes at the school started session that fall. The first students to graduate from Lakeside were mainly transfers from nearby Evans High School.

Lakeside's football stadium, Panther Stadium, was added to the campus in 1995, adjacent to Lakeside Middle School.

Athletics

Baseball
Basketball (boys' and girls', varsity and JV)
Cheerleading (varsity and JV for both football and basketball)
Cross Country
Dance Team
Esports
Football (varsity and JV), girl's flag football
Golf
Lacrosse (boys' and girls')
Softball (varsity and JV)
Soccer (boys' and girls', varsity and JV)
Swimming (boys' and girls')
Track
Tennis
Volleyball (varsity and JV)
Wrestling (boys' and girls')

Notable alumni
 Dave Haywood, member of country music group Lady Antebellum; guitar and background vocals
 Reese Hoffa, Olympic shot putter
 Charles Kelley, member of country music group Lady Antebellum; brother to artist Josh Kelley
 Josh Kelley, recording artist
 Keith Robinson, actor (Dreamgirls)

References

External links
 Lakeside High School
 Columbia County Board of Education

High schools in Columbia County, Georgia
Public high schools in Georgia (U.S. state)
1988 establishments in Georgia (U.S. state)
Educational institutions established in 1988